Paulo Silva (born May 24, 1966) is a former Brazilian footballer and manager who played in Brazil, Canada, and served on the coaching staff with the Toronto Lynx in the USL A-League.

Club career 
Silva played in the Campeonato Mineiro with Cruzeiro in 1984, and later signed with Democrata Futebol Clube in 1987. He was awarded the Best Player Award in 1987, and was selected State All-Star Goalkeeper. In 1990, Silva went overseas to Canada to sign with the Scarborough Astros of the Canadian National Soccer League. During his tenure with the Astros he was awarded the CNSL Goalkeeper of the Year within three years from 1990, 1991, and 1993. In 1995, he helped Scarborough finish first in the League Cup standings, and reached the cup finals but lost the title to St. Catharines Wolves in a penalty shootout. He was also selected to the CNSL All-Star team that faced Parma in 1995.

He signed with league rivals Toronto Supra for the 1996 season. For the second consecutive season he was named to the CNSL All-Star team, and played against Toronto Italia which included Diego Maradona. In 2001, he came out of retirement to play to newly expansion franchise the Brampton Hitmen of the Canadian Professional Soccer League. Silva would also make an appearance in 2003 with the North York Astros on September 10, 2003, in a match against Toronto Croatia.

Managerial career 
In 1998, he was named the goalkeeper coach for Toronto Lynx under head coach Peter Pinizzotto. He also served as an assistant coach, and team scout in the 1999 season. In 2005, he returned to the Toronto Lynx as a goalkeeper coach under Hubert Busby Jr. He was also the technical director for the Toronto Eagles Soccer Academy in 2005. In 2021, he joined the Genesis Football Academy staff as the goalkeeper coach.

References 

Living people
Brazilian footballers
Brazilian expatriate footballers
Canadian Soccer League (1998–present) players
Cruzeiro Esporte Clube players
Brampton Stallions (Hitmen) players
Brazilian football managers
Democrata Futebol Clube players
North York Astros players
SC Toronto players
Toronto Lynx coaches
Canadian National Soccer League players
1966 births
Association football goalkeepers
People from Ipatinga
Brazilian expatriate sportspeople in Canada
Expatriate soccer players in Canada
Sportspeople from Minas Gerais